The 1998 Pittsburgh Panthers football team represented the University of Pittsburgh in the 1998 NCAA Division I-A football season. Future Iowa State head coach Matt Campbell was a member of the team.

Schedule

Coaching staff

Team players drafted into the NFL

References

Pittsburgh
Pittsburgh Panthers football seasons
Pittsburgh Panthers football